Denis Oswald may refer to:

 Denis Oswald (sports official) (born 1947), a Swiss rower and sports official
 Denis Oswald (codebreaker) (1910–1998), an English cricketer, educator and a codebreaker at Bletchley Park

See also
 Denis Oswald Jordan, an Anglo-Australian chemist